Sector 7 is a 2011 South Korean 3D and monster horror-science fiction action film directed by Kim Ji-hoon who previously made May 18.

In 2012 Shout! Factory released the film on DVD, Blu-ray Disc, and Blu-ray 3D.

Plot 
A small team of oil rig workers are searching for undiscovered oil at the oil rig Sector 7, off the coast of Jeju Island. After the tension builds from countless failures, the main character Hae-joon's uncle returns with the hope of searching the untapped wells of oil. What they don't realize is that he has a much different motive. Working together with a researcher on board the rig, he plans to breed a newly discovered life-form whose bodily fluids can burn for longer than 30 hours, as a new form of fuel instead of oil.

But tragedy strikes as the specimen escapes with deaths of the researcher, the doctor, and another worker to follow. With the loss of the main power, the workers become stranded as the creature begins to hunt for its next meal. Armed with nothing but a few guns and the knowledge of the creature's minor susceptibility to flame, the remaining workers must work together to kill the beast before it hunts them down one by one, and escape the oil rig. But with its incredible speed (despite its size), its lightning fast, spear-like tongue, and its nearly impenetrable hide, they may not stand a chance.

Production process 
Of the 1,800 cuts, the CG accounted for 1,748 cuts. The monsters appearing in the movie come from the appearance of sea creatures such as sea squirt.

Cast 
 Ha Ji-won as Cha Hae-joon
 Oh Ji-ho as Kim Dong-soo
 Ahn Sung-ki as Captain Lee Jeong-man
 Park Chul-min as Do Sang-goo
 Song Sae-byeok as Go Jong-yoon
 Lee Han-wi as Jang Moon-hyeong
 Cha Ye-ryun as Park Hyeon-jeong

References

External links 
  
 
 
 
 

2011 films
2011 science fiction action films
2011 3D films
South Korean science fiction action films
South Korean 3D films
Underwater action films
Giant monster films
Films set in 1985
Films set in 2011
Films set in Jeju
Films directed by Kim Ji-hoon
IMAX films
CJ Entertainment films
2010s Korean-language films
Films with underwater settings
2010s South Korean films